East Coast Love Affair is the debut solo album by the jazz guitarist Kurt Rosenwinkel.

Track listing

Personnel

Kurt Rosenwinkel – Guitar
Avishai Cohen – Bass
Jorge Rossy – Drums

References

External links 
East Coast Love Affair at Fresh Sound Records

1996 live albums
Kurt Rosenwinkel albums
Fresh Sound live albums